Jan van Aken (1614-1661), a Dutch painter.
Jan van Aken (politician) (1961), a German politician
Jan van Aken (writer) (1961), a Dutch writer